Cameron Clark may refer to:

 Cameron Clark (American football) (born 1997), American football offensive tackle
 Cameron Clark (basketball) (born 1991), American basketball player
 Cameron Clark (footballer, born 2000), Scottish association football player
 Cameron Clark (rugby union) (born 1993), Australian rugby union sevens player
 Cameron Clark (Hollyoaks), a fictional character from the British soap opera Hollyoaks

See also
 Cam Clarke (born 1957), American voice actor